Allan Roy Oliver (1936 – November 24, 2021) was a Canadian politician who represented Shaunavon on the Legislative Assembly of the province of Saskatchewan from 1971 to 1975. He was a member of the Saskatchewan New Democratic Party.

References 

1936 births
2021 deaths
20th-century Canadian legislators
Saskatchewan New Democratic Party MLAs
People from Shaunavon, Saskatchewan